The Reid and Sigrist R.S.3 Desford was a British twin-engined, three-seat advanced trainer developed in the Second World War for postwar use. Although the R.S.3 was evaluated as a trainer, the type never entered production and was eventually rebuilt as the R.S.4 Bobsleigh as an experimental aircraft with the pilot in a prone position, seen as advantageous in minimising g-force effects in fighters.

Design and development
Reid and Sigrist in Desford, Leicestershire, England, were an important instrument manufacturer in the interwar era, specialising in aircraft applications leading to the forming of an aviation division in 1937 at the New Malden, Surrey factory site. The first product was a twin-engined advanced trainer, the R.S.1 Snargasher (1939) which was eventually relegated to company hack used primarily at the factory and Desford aerodrome.

The follow-up design, the R.S.3 Desford (taking its name from the company site) was similar in size and concept to its predecessor although it was only configured for a pilot and trainee and featured a low-set wing. The R.S.3 was powered by two 130 hp de Havilland Gipsy Major Series I engines, rather than the higher powered de Havilland Gipsy Six engines of the earlier R.S.1. The overall shape was more pleasing than the dumpy R.S.1 and the pleasant flying characteristics of the earlier machine were retained.

Operational history
The prototype, registered as G-AGOS first flew on 9 July 1945, shortly before VJ Day. Evaluated as a private venture project by test pilots including famed postwar flyer, Janusz Żurakowski at the Aeroplane and Armament Experimental Establishment (A&AEE) at RAF Boscombe Down, the R.S.3 was generally found to be well suited as a multi-engine primary and intermediate trainer. However, RAF interest was lukewarm due to the glut of surplus wartime training aircraft available. The prototype appeared at the Farnborough Airshow in 1946, and was allocated to the Institute of Aviation Medicine but by May 1949, it was deregistered as a civilian aircraft, flying subsequently with RAF serial number VZ728.

Further development of the type continued as the company wanted to establish itself as an aviation engineering and production concern although its postwar work primarily centred on instrument and camera production, especially in creating a copy of the German Leica.

When Royal Air Force high-speed research explored high g-forces encountered in manoeuvres, a number of prone-pilot experimental aircraft including the Gloster Meteor F8 "Prone Pilot" were produced. To investigate low-speed applications, the R.S.4 Bobsleigh was a radical conversion of the R.S.3 reconfigured into a single pilot operation with a prone pilot station in the new rounded nose. This section was equipped with a transparent cone which covered a large section of the nose and two separate transparent ports to give minimal sideways and rearwards views. The R.S.4 was first flown in this form on 13 June 1951. Although useful data was obtained, the R.S.4's prone pilot did have difficulty with the initial control setup. Today's hang glider pilots have found the prone position an ideal means of controlling flight as well as providing a streamlined profile.

Experimental testing was conducted by the Royal Aircraft Establishment (RAE) at Farnborough and continued until January 1956 when the R.S.4 returned to the UK civil registry, again as G-AGOS. It was used at one time as an air photo aircraft by Film Aviation Services and remained in flyable condition until 1973. After a period at the Snibston Discovery Park, the R.S.4 was moved to Spanhoe, Northamptonshire for restoration by Windmill Aviation. The restored Desford flew again on 22 April 2018, but the aircraft's owners, Leicestershire County Council, did not publicly display the Desford. The Desford was delivered to the Newark Air Museum on 19 August 2022.

Specifications (R.S.3 - Gipsy Major 30)

See also

References

Notes

Bibliography
 Dunnell, Ben. "Desford makes final flight". Aeroplane, October 2022, Vol. 50, No. 10. p. 6. .
 Gunston, Bill. Back to the Drawing Board: Aircraft That Flew, but Never Took Off. London: Zenith Imprint, 1996. .
 Gunston, Bill. World Encyclopedia of Aircraft Manufacturers: From the Pioneers to the Present Day. Annapolis, Maryland: Naval Institute Press, 1993. .
 "Reid and Sigrist R.S.3 Desford." Control Column, Official Organ of the British Aircraft Preservation Council, Volume 13, No. 2, February/March 1979.
 Swanborough, Gordon. British Aircraft at War, 1939–1945. East Sussex, UK: HPC Publishing, 1997. .

1940s British military trainer aircraft
Prone pilot aircraft
Low-wing aircraft
Aircraft first flown in 1945
Twin piston-engined tractor aircraft
Twin-tail aircraft